San Julián is a municipality in the Sonsonate department of El Salvador.

Sports
The local football club is named C.D. Espartano and it currently plays in the Salvadoran Third Division.

See also
Puerto San Julián

Municipalities of the Sonsonate Department